Schwyz District is a district of the canton of Schwyz, Switzerland. It is both the largest and most populous of the six districts of the canton of Schwyz, accounting for around half its surface area, and 40% of the population.

The district contains a total of 15 municipalities, of which the town of Schwyz is the capital.

References

Districts of the canton of Schwyz